Çubuk-2 Dam is a dam in Çubuk, Ankara Province, Turkey. The development was backed by the Turkish State Hydraulic Works. It was constructed between 1961 and 1964.

See also
Çubuk-1 Dam
List of dams and reservoirs in Turkey

External links
DSI directory, State Hydraulic Works (Turkey), Retrieved December 16, 2009

Dams in Ankara Province